Aribert is a Germanic given name, from hari ("host") and beraht ("bright"). It may refer to:
Aribert (archbishop of Milan)
Prince Aribert of Anhalt (1866–1933), regent of Anhalt 
Aribert Heim (1914–1992), Austrian Schutzstaffel (SS) doctor, also known as Dr. Death and Butcher of Mauthausen
Aribert Heymann (1898–1946), German field hockey player
Aribert Mog (1904–1941), German actor 
Aribert Reimann (born 1936), German composer, pianist and accompanist
Aribert Wäscher (1895–1961), German actor

See also
Herbert (given name)

German masculine given names